Matak (also Romanized as Mātak and Matek) is a village in Tulem Rural District, Tulem District, Sowme'eh Sara County, Gilan Province, Iran. At the 2006 census, its population was 888, in 242 families.

References 

Populated places in Sowme'eh Sara County